Inge Grødum (born 13 August 1943) is a Norwegian illustrator.

He was born in Ulefoss, and attended the Norwegian National Academy of Craft and Art Industry from 1970 to 1973. He worked for the newspaper Nationen from 1973 to 1987 and in Aftenposten since 1987. He has published several books with collections of his editorial cartoons. He won the Editorial Cartoon of the Year award in 2002.

References

1943 births
Living people
People from Ulefoss
People from Nome, Norway
Norwegian illustrators
Norwegian women illustrators
Norwegian editorial cartoonists
Oslo National Academy of the Arts alumni